Papon Singh (born 31 December 1999) is a Bangladeshi professional footballer who plays as a centre midfielder for Bangladesh Premier League club Abahani Limited Dhaka and the Bangladesh national team.

International career
On 1 June 2022, Papon made his international debut for Bangladesh  during a FIFA Friendly, against Indonesia, he came on to the field in the 88th minute in place of Biplu Ahmed.

Career statistics

Club

Notes

International apps

References

External links
 

Living people
1999 births
Abahani Limited (Dhaka) players
Uttar Baridhara SC players
Bangladeshi footballers
Bangladesh international footballers
Bangladesh youth international footballers
Association football midfielders
People from Netrokona District
Bangladeshi Hindus
Bangladesh Football Premier League players